Carpilius is a genus of crabs in the family Carpiliidae, containing the following species:

References

External links

Crabs